Mandalar Thiri Stadium is a multi-use stadium, located in Mandalay, Myanmar. It located east of the Mingalar Mandalay. Its address is between 68th and 73rd, between 102A rd and 107 rd, beside of the Mandalay Football Academy. The stadium hosted the women's football tournament in the 2013 Southeast Asian Games and is also the home of Yadanarbon F.C. It has become one of the landmarks of Mandalay, Myanmar.

Mandalar Thiri Indoor Stadium 
The Mandalar Thiri Stadium complex is also home of an indoor stadium where many local and international Lethwei events are hosted. The World Lethwei Championship hosted many events at this venue.

Gallery

References

Athletics (track and field) venues in Myanmar
Football venues in Myanmar
Sports venues completed in 2013